Sir Edward Birkbeck, 1st Baronet  (11 October 1838 – 2 September 1908) was a Conservative Party politician in the United Kingdom.

Biography
Birkbeck was born in 1838 and served as Conservative MP for North Norfolk from 1879 (being returned at a by-election following the death of Colonel Duff) to 1885 and for East Norfolk from 1885 to 1892. He was defeated in the 1892 general election by Sir Robert Price. He was created a baronet, of Horstead Hall, in the parish of Horstead, in the County of Norfolk on 9 March 1886. The baronetage became extinct in 1908 on his death.

Birkbeck resided at Horstead Hall, a mansion located in extensive and secluded grounds outside Horstead, Norfolk, remodelled in the Tudor style in 1835. He entertained Lord Salisbury there on at least one occasion (1887), and bred Jersey cattle there. Sir Edward greatly improved the farm buildings, adding, among other things, a watertower in the Italian style that remains a local landmark, cottages and one of the two lodges facing towards Buxton.

Sir Edward served as, among other things, President of the National Sea Fisheries Protection Association, and Chairman of the Royal National Lifeboat Institution.

In June 1902 he was on board German torpedo boat S. 42 when it sank off Cuxhaven, after it was accidentally run over by the steam ship SS Frisby. Sir Edward had been granted passage in the torpedo boat from Heligoland to Cuxhaven, returning from the Dover to Heligoland yacht race, and survived unharmed, though the captain and several German crew members drowned.

Sir Edward Birkbeck died on 2 September 1908. The Horstead Hall estate passed to a collateral branch of the family. His wife survived him. A branch of the family still resides in the area, at Rippon Hall, a mansion in much the same style between Buxton and Reepham.

References

External links 

1838 births
1908 deaths
Conservative Party (UK) MPs for English constituencies
Baronets in the Baronetage of the United Kingdom
Deputy Lieutenants of Norfolk
Knights Commander of the Royal Victorian Order
UK MPs 1885–1886
UK MPs 1886–1892
People from Broadland (district)